The 2019-20 Michigan Tech Huskies men's ice hockey season was the 99th season of play for the program and the 58th in the WCHA conference. The Huskies represented Michigan Technological University and were coached by Joe Shawhan, in his 3rd season. 

The team's season ended abruptly when the WCHA announced that the remainder of the tournament was cancelled due to the COVID-19 pandemic in the United States on March 12, 2020.

Roster

As of October 6, 2019.

Standings

Schedule and Results

|-
!colspan=12 style=";" | Regular Season

|-
!colspan=12 style=";" | 

|-
!colspan=12 style=";" | 

|- align="center" bgcolor="#e0e0e0"
|colspan=12|Remainder of Tournament Cancelled

Scoring Statistics

Goaltending statistics

Rankings

Players drafted into the NHL

2020 NHL Entry Draft

† incoming freshman

References

Michigan Tech Huskies men's ice hockey seasons
Michigan Tech Huskies 
Michigan Tech Huskies 
Michigan Tech Huskies 
Michigan Tech Huskies